Donna Culleton (née Ewe, born 14 October 1964) is a former New Zealand rugby union player. She played Prop for the Black Ferns at RugbyFest 1990 and at the inaugural 1991 Women's Rugby World Cup.

References 

1964 births
Living people
New Zealand women's international rugby union players
New Zealand female rugby union players